Yo, Jo, Io, or just Ë  (Ё ё; italics: Ё ё) is a letter of the Cyrillic script. In Unicode, the letter  is named CYRILLIC CAPITAL/SMALL LETTER IO.

In English, the letter Yo is romanized using the Latin ë (according to the ALA–LC and British Standards), ë (yë word-initially) (BGN/PCGN) or yo/jo (orthographic transcription) for Russian, and as i͡o (ALA–LC), yo (BGN/PCGN), or ë (BSI) for Belarusian. In international systems, Yo is romanized as ë (ISO 9).

It was derived from the Cyrillic letter Ye (Е е).

Pronunciation
 This section describes the pronunciation in Russian and Belarusian. Other languages may have subtle differences.

The letter  is a stressed syllable in the overwhelming majority of Russian and Belarusian words. In Russian, unstressed  occurs only in compound numerals and a few derived terms, wherein it is considered an exception.

It is a so-called iotated vowel. In initial or post-vocalic position, it represents the sounds , like in 'York'.

The letter  also indicates the phoneme  together with palatalization of the preceding consonant (if it is possible). No  sound occurs between the consonant and the vowel in this case.

Exact pronunciation of the vowel sound of  can vary because of allophony in Slavic languages. In Russian, it is pronounced , with an  vowel similar to bird in New Zealand or South African English; see palatalization for some background.

Usage
Yo was first used in Russian, but its status in that language is now ambiguous. Yo occurs as a discrete letter in the Cyrillic alphabets of Belarusian, Rusyn, Mongolian and many Caucasian and Turkic languages.

Russian

The letter Yo or Jo is the seventh letter of the alphabet, but although it indicates a distinct sound from Ye, it is often treated as the same letter for alphabetisation and sorting. In the dictionary,  (hedgehog) comes after  (eater) and before  (to go).

 represents the phoneme  after  or a soft consonant (or occasionally after), and it should always be stressed.

Compare, for example, Russian  mojo ("my" neuter nominative and accusative singular) and Polish/Czech/Slovak/Serbo-Croatian/Slovenian moje. However, since the sound change took place after the introduction of writing, the letter  continued to be written in that position. It was not until the 18th century that efforts were made to represent the sound in writing.

This digraph and new letter  for the sound  were proposed to be added to the official alphabet in 1783 at a session of the Russian Academy under the presidency of Princess Yekaterina Romanovna Vorontsova-Dashkova, but both propositions were rejected by the academicians and the Metropolitan of Novgorod and Saint Petersburg Gavriil.

The sounds [jo] (and [o] after soft consonants) that developed in Russian pronunciation, for a long time were not distinguished from [je] (and [e] after soft consonants) in writing. In the mid-18th century, a ligature in the form of the letters IO with a top joiner was introduced, but it was cumbersome and used rarely. Other variants in use were: о, ьо, їô, ió, ио.

In 1797, instead of existing options, the letter "Ё" was created by Russian Imperial historian, writer, poet and critic Nikolay Mikhailovich Karamzin. It was used for the first time in the 2nd book of "Aonides" in his poem "Sophistiated Solomon's Wisdom, or Thoughts Selected from Ecclesiastes" to create a rhyme between the words слёзы [ˈslʲɵzɨ] and розы [ˈrozɨ]. In other places of the poem he used the spelling слезы [ˈslʲezɨ].

The diaeresis ◌̈ does not appear above any other letter in Russian.

By and large, it is used only in dictionaries and in pedagogical literature intended for children and students of Russian as a second language. Recent recommendations (2006) from the Russian Language Institute are to use  in proper nouns to avoid an incorrect pronunciation. It is permitted, however, to mark  whenever it occurs, which is the preference of some Russian authors and periodicals.

Some examples are pre-Unicode character pages 866 for Microsoft DOS and 1251 for Microsoft Windows. Since in both cases,  was placed outside its alphabetically correct position, it made text sorting more complex.

Transcription of foreign words

However, this is due to the fact that this word stems from French sérieux with an  sound. (In the 19th and the early 20th century, both spellings were in use. The spelling with  — in the pre-1918 orthography— was based on Latin seriosus.)

The letter  is normally used to transcribe the Japanese  into Russian Cyrillic, appearing in the Russian transcription of Japanese that would appear as yo (よ), kyo (きょ), sho (しょ) etc. in Hepburn Romanization, but there are a few traditional spellings which break this rule. In such transcriptions, as well as in languages other than Russian where ё is used, the use of ё rather than е is obligatory.

Legal issues
It is thought that the letter  is found in at least 2500 surnames used in Russia and other states of the former USSR. On occasion such mismatches caused problems to citizens who receive inheritance or complete property transactions.

Belarusian and Rusyn
Yo is the seventh letter of the Belarusian alphabet and the ninth letter of the Prešov Rusyn alphabet of Slovakia, in the Pannonian Rusyn alphabet, yo is absent.

Dungan
Unlike the Russian spelling system,  is mandatory in the Cyrillic alphabet used by Dungan. In that Sinitic language, the / distinction is crucial, as the former is used such as to write the syllable that would have the pinyin spelling of ye in Standard Chinese, and the latter is used for the syllable that appears as yao in pinyin.  is very prominent in Dungan spelling since the very common syllable appearing as yang in Pinyin is spelled  in Dungan.

Mongolian
It represents the syllable /jɔ/. For example, the word for "two" in Mongolian, "khoyor", is spelled as хоёр.

Ukrainian
In some older alphabets used for Ukrainian, such as Panteleimon Kulish's Kulishivka's alphabet,  was formerly used for the sound —. This letter no longer exists in the modern Ukrainian alphabet.

In modern Ukrainian spelling, the sound — is written as  after soft consonants in the middle of words (such as "нього", "him" after a preposition), and  elsewhere (such as "його", "him").

Related letters and other similar characters

Е е : Cyrillic letter Ye
Ë ë : E with diaeresis - an Albanian and Kashubian letter
Ε ε : Greek letter epsilon
E e : Latin letter E
Ɛ ɛ : Latin letter epsilon
О о : Cyrillic letter O
Ө ө : Cyrillic letter Oe
Ӭ ӭ : Cyrillic letter E with diaeresis

Computing codes

Computer Software 
There are computer software or extension that is used to restore the Cyrillic letter Yo ⟨⟩ in Russian texts in places where the letter Ye ⟨⟩ was used instead. ORFO and Yoficator are examples of such.

See also 
Reforms of Russian orthography
ORFO
Yoficator

References

External links 

 

Vowel letters
Letters with diaeresis